Jalinus (also spelled Jilunus) was a 7th-century Armenian dynast, who was one of the leading figures in Sasanian Iran. He was the commander of the guard over Khosrow II, during the latter's imprisonment. Jalinus was a Sasanian commander during the Arab conquest of Iran.

Background and identity 
The name of Jalinus is the Arabic form of his original, Greek name, Galen. According to Pourshariati, the name was most likely not his personal name, but a title of his. He was probably one of the Armenian dynasty that became entangled in Sasanian history. He may have been the same person as Mushegh III Mamikonian or Gregory of Siwnik, who both also served the Sasanians in the early 7th-century.

Biography

Jalinus is first mentioned as the commander over Khosrow II, during the latter's imprisonment in 628. Although Khosrow had been overthrown and imprisoned by his son Kavad II Sheroe, he was still treated like a monarch, with Jalinus even addressing him with the formula anōšag buwād ("may he be immortal"). After his defeat at the battle of Kaskar, Jalinus was sent by Yazdegerd III to crush the invading Arab forces along with 60,000 men and the commander-in-chief of all armies of the empire, Rostam Farrokhzād at the Battle of al-Qādisiyyah. Jalinus commanded the Right center of the army. After Rostam's death at the battle and the other commanders' withdrawal, Jalinus took command of what was left of the Sasanian army. He gained control of the bridgehead, and succeeded in getting the bulk of the Sasanian army across the bridge safely. He was killed at the battle of al-Qadisiyyah.

References

Sources 
 
 

7th-century Armenian people
Generals of Yazdegerd III
Armenian nobility
636 deaths
Year of birth unknown
Armenian people from the Sasanian Empire
Generals of Kavad II